Columbia County is a county located in the north central portion of the U.S. state of Florida. As of the 2020 census, the population was 69,698, up from 67,531 at the 2010 census. Its county seat is Lake City.

Columbia County comprises the Lake City, FL Micropolitan Statistical Area, which is included in the Gainesville-Lake City, FL Combined Statistical Area. Osceola National Forest is partially in Columbia County.

History
After Florida became a territory of the United States in 1821, pioneer and immigrant settlers from the United States formed their own settlement adjacent to a Seminole village called Alligator Village, and called it Alligator. Following the 1823 Treaty of Moultrie Creek, the residents of Alligator village relocated to the banks of Peace Creek in the newly established Seminole reservation, leaving Alligator Town on its own.

When Columbia County was formed in 1832 from Duval and Alachua counties, Alligator Town was designated as the seat of the county government. It was renamed as Columbia, the poetic form for the United States. The county was developed for agriculture and the timber industry, with products such as turpentine, lumber, and plywood. From 1832 to 1839, the county seat was Newnansville, but that town and area were returned to Alachua County.

In November 1858 a railroad was completed connecting Jacksonville to Alligator, which opened the town to more commerce and passenger traffic. Alligator Town was incorporated and its name changed to Lake City in 1859; M. Whit Smith was elected as the town's first mayor. According to an urban legend, the name was changed because the mayor's wife Martha Jane, who had recently moved to the town, refused to hang her lace curtains in a town named Alligator.

During the American Civil War, the railroad between Lake City and Jacksonville was used to send beef and salt to Confederate soldiers. In February 1864 Union troops under Truman Seymour advanced west from Jacksonville. His objective was to disrupt Confederate supplies, and obtain African-American recruits and supplies. Confederate General Joseph Finnegan assembled troops and called for reinforcements from P. G. T. Beauregard in response to the Union threat. On February 11, 1864, Finnegan's troops defeated a Union cavalry raid in Lake City. After the Union cavalry was repulsed, Finnegan moved his forces to Olustee Station about ten miles east of Lake City. The Confederate presence at Olustee Station was reinforced to prepare for the Union troops coming from Jacksonville.

Union forces engaged the Confederates at the Battle of Olustee on February 20, 1864, near the Olustee Station. It was the only major battle in Florida during the war. Union casualties were 1,861 men killed, wounded or missing; Confederate casualties were 946 killed, wounded or missing. The Confederate dead were buried in Lake City. In 1928 a memorial for the Battle of Olustee was established in downtown Lake City.

In 1874 Lake City's first newspaper was published in 1874, called the Lake City Reporter. In 1876 the Bigelow Building was completed; it later was adapted for use as the City Hall. The first fire department was established in 1883 to complement the police department. In 1891 Lake City became the first city in Florida to have electric lights from a local power and light company.

White violence rose against blacks in the late 19th century in a regionwide effort to establish and maintain white supremacy as Southern states disenfranchised most blacks and imposed Jim Crow. Whites lynched 20 African Americans in Columbia County from 1877 to 1950, mostly in the decades near the turn of the 20th century. It was tied with Polk County for the second-highest total of lynchings of any county in the state.

Among these murders was the mass lynching on May 21, 1911, of six black men who were taken from the jail by a white mob in Lake City. They were being held on charges of murdering one white sawmill worker and wounding another in Leon County, after whites had attacked them at a private house following an earlier altercation between two men. A group of a dozen white men, reportedly from Tallahassee, tricked the white youth guarding the jail by posing as officials and gained release of the suspects. They took the men outside town and shot them repeatedly to death.

Geography

Osceola National Forest is partially within the county.

Adjacent counties

 Echols County, Georgia - north
 Clinch County, Georgia - northeast
 Baker County - east
 Union County - southeast
 Alachua County - south
 Gilchrist County - southwest
 Suwannee County - west
 Hamilton County - northwest

National protected area
 Osceola National Forest (part)

Demographics

As of the 2020 United States census, there were 69,698 people, 25,205 households, and 15,740 families residing in the county.

As of the census of 2000, there were 56,513 people, 20,925 households, and 14,919 families residing in the county.  The population density was 71 people per square mile (27/km2).  There were 23,579 housing units at an average density of 30 per square mile (11/km2).  The racial makeup of the county was 79.72% White, 17.03% Black or African American, 0.53% Native American, 0.67% Asian, 0.04% Pacific Islander, 0.60% from other races, and 1.42% from two or more races.  2.74% of the population were Hispanic or Latino of any race.

There were 20,925 households, out of which 32.10% had children under the age of 18 living with them, 53.70% were married couples living together, 12.90% had a female householder with no husband present, and 28.70% were non-families. 23.80% of all households were made up of individuals, and 9.80% had someone living alone who was 65 years of age or older.  The average household size was 2.56 and the average family size was 3.02.

In the county, the population was spread out, with 25.40% under the age of 18, 9.00% from 18 to 24, 27.70% from 25 to 44, 24.00% from 45 to 64, and 14.00% who were 65 years of age or older.  The median age was 37 years. For every 100 females there were 102.90 males.  For every 100 females age 18 and over, there were 101.70 males.

The median income for a household in the county was $30,881, and the median income for a family was $35,927. Males had a median income of $27,353 versus $21,738 for females. The per capita income for the county was $14,598.  About 11.40% of families and 15.00% of the population were below the poverty line, including 17.10% of those under age 18 and 13.60% of those age 65 or over.

Politics

Voter registration
According to the Secretary of State's office, Republicans are the majority of registered voters in Columbia County.

Statewide elections

Education

The Columbia County School District operates public schools.

Library
The Columbia County Public Library consists of 3 branches.
 Main Branch
 West Branch
 Fort White Branch

Transportation

Airports
Columbia County's main airport is Lake City Municipal Airport. Private airports also exist throughout the county.

Major roads

  Interstate 10 is the main west-to-east interstate highway in the county, and serves as the unofficial dividing line between northern and southern Columbia County. It contains three interchanges within the county; the first being I-75 in Springville (Exits 296 A-B), and the other two in Five Points, north of Lake City, US 41 (Exit 301), and US 441(Exit 303). Beyond this point I-10 runs through Osceola National Forest.
  Interstate 75 is the southeast-to-northwest interstate highway in the county, which enters from Alachua County at bridges over the Santa Fe River. It has four interchanges in the county with US 41/441 in Ellisville (Exit 414), SR 47 (Exit 423), US 90 in Lake City (Exit 427) and I-10 in Springville (Exits 435 A-B).
  US 27 is another southeast-to-northwest road in southwestern Columbia County, that enters from a bridge over the Santa Fe River, runs through Fort White, and leaves at another bridge over the Ichetucknee River at Ichetucknee Springs State Park.
  US 41 runs north from High Springs in a concurrency with US 441 until just before it reaches Lake City, Then the two routes run parallel to each other until US 41 branches off to the northwest on its way to Hamilton County, Valdosta, Georgia, and points north.
  US 90 was the main west-to-east highway in the county, until it was surpassed by I-10. It enters the county from Wellborn in Suwannee County, and directly enters Lake City. East of the city, it runs along the southern edge of Osceola National Forest and serves as the address of two major prisons before crossing the Baker County Line and entering a portion of the forest itself.
  US 441 runs north from High Springs in a concurrency with US 41 until just before it reaches Lake City, Then the two routes run parallel to each other, but unlike US 41, US 441 stays in Columbia County and runs straight north and south until it crosses the Georgia State Line.
  State Road 2 is located on the far northeast corner of the county, and has no intersections whatsoever.
  State Road 47 is a northeast-to-southwest road that spans from Trenton in Gilchrist County to US 41 in Lake City. North of there it becomes a hidden state road along US 41 until it reaches US Truck Route 90, then turns east, only to turn north again onto US 441 where it remains for the duration until it crosses the Florida-Georgia State Line.
  State Road 100 runs northwest to southeast from Hamilton County in an overlap with southbound US 41, until it reaches US 90 in Lake City, where it runs east in an overlap with that route before branching off on its own in Watertown, then runs southeast towards the Union County Line. 
  State Road 238 runs west to east in Ellisville and only exists for one and a half miles in the county, but still serves as an important route to Lake Butler in Union County.
  State Road 247 is a northeast to southwest road that spans from Branford in Suwannee County, and terminates at US 90 in western Lake City, just east of US 90's interchange with I-75.

Railroads
Columbia County has at least three existing railroad lines. The primary one is a Florida Gulf & Atlantic Railroad line formerly owned by CSX, Seaboard System Railroad, Seaboard Coastline Industries and Seaboard Air Line Railroad that served Amtrak's Sunset Limited until it was truncated to New Orleans in 2005 by Hurricane Katrina. Lake City (Amtrak station) was Columbia County's only active railroad station until that point. Until 1971, Lake City was a stop on the Louisville and Nashville and Seaboard Coast Line's Gulf Wind (New Orleans - Jacksonville). The Seaboard Air Line operated this and another passenger train in each direction through Lake City until 1966 or 1967. Another one is owned by the Georgia Southern and Florida Railway, and runs along US 41 from Lake City through Hamilton County. A third line runs along SR 100 into Union County.

Communities

City
 Lake City

Town
 Fort White

Census-designated places
 Five Points
 Watertown

Other unincorporated communities
 Columbia City
 Lulu
 Mikesville
 Newco
 Winfield

See also

 National Register of Historic Places listings in Columbia County, Florida

Notes

References

External links

Government links/Constitutional offices
 Columbia County Government / Board of County Commissioners
 Columbia County Supervisor of Elections
 Columbia County Property Appraiser
 Columbia County Tax Collector
 Columbia County Sheriff's Office
 Columbia County Tourism

Special districts
 Columbia County Public Schools
 Columbia County Public Libraries
 Suwannee River Florida Water Management District
 Columbia Amateur Radio Society since 1958

Judicial branch
 Columbia County Clerk of Courts
 Public Defender, 3rd Judicial Circuit of Florida serving Columbia, Dixie, Hamilton, Lafayette, Madison, Suwannee, and Taylor Counties
 Office of the State Attorney, 3rd Judicial Circuit of Florida
 Circuit and County Court, 3rd Judicial Circuit of Florida

Tourism links
 Lake City Weather dot Com Get LIVE Weather Reports here.
 Columbia County Tourism Development Council

 
1832 establishments in Florida Territory
Populated places established in 1832
1830s establishments in Florida
Charter counties in Florida
North Florida